Charles Franklin (1880–1932) was an Irish motorcycle racer and engineer.

Charles Franklin may also refer to:

Charles Samuel Franklin (1879–1964), British radio pioneer
Charles Franklin (author) (1909–1976), British author of mystery novels and spy novels
Charles D. Franklin (1931–1992), U.S. Army officer
Albert Franklin Banta (1843–1924), American newspaperman, politician, jurist, and army scout also known as Charles A. Franklin

See also
Charles Franklyn (1896–1982), doctor